The Aursund Bridge is a cantilever bridge that crosses the Aursundet strait in Aure Municipality in Møre og Romsdal county, Norway. The bridge goes between just north of the village of Aure on the mainland and the island of Ruøya. Along with the Mjosund Bridge, it is part of the road connection between the mainland and the island of Ertvågsøya.

See also
List of bridges in Norway
List of bridges in Norway by length
List of bridges
List of bridges by length

References

Aure, Norway
Bridges in Møre og Romsdal
Bridges completed in 1995
Cantilever bridges